The Vincentian ambassador in Washington, D. C. is the official representative of the Government in the Kingstown to the Government of the United States.

List of representatives

References

 
 

 
United States
Saint Vincent and the Grenadines
Saint Vincent and the Grenadines–United States relations